Year 1157 (MCLVII) was a common year starting on Tuesday (link will display the full calendar) of the Julian calendar.

Events 
 January 12 – March 16 – Caliph Al-Muqtafi successfully defends Baghdad against the coalition forces of Sultan Muhammad of Hamadan, and Atabeg Qutb-adin of Mosul.
 Albert I of Brandenburg begins his ruthless program to pacify the Slavic region.
 June 11 – Albert I of Brandenburg, also called The Bear (Ger: Albrecht der Bär), becomes the founder of the Margraviate of Brandenburg, Germany and the first Margrave.
August 12 - The 1157 Hama earthquake takes place after a year of foreshocks. Its name is taken from the city of Hama, in west-central Syria (then under Seljuk rule), where the most casualties are sustained.
 August 21 – Sancho III and Ferdinand II, the sons of King Alfonso VII of Castile, divide his kingdom between them upon his death.
 October 23 – Battle of Grathe Heath: A civil war in Denmark ends with the death of King Sweyn III. Valdemar I of Denmark becomes king of all Denmark, and restores and rebuilds the country.
 Henry II of England grants a charter to the merchants of Lincoln (approximate date).
 Battle of Ewloe: Henry II of England invades Wales, and is defeated by Owain Gwynedd.
 Nur ad-Din Zengi besieges the Knights Hospitaller in the crusader fortress of Banyas, routs a relief army led by King Baldwin III of Jerusalem, and takes Grand Master Bertrand de Blanquefort prisoner.

Births 

 September 8 – King Richard I of England (d. 1199)
 Alexander Neckham, English scholar, teacher, theologian and abbot of Cirencester Abbey (d. 1217)
 Leopold V of Austria, Duke of Austria from 1177 and Duke of Styria from 1192 until his death (d. 1194)
 Margaret of France, Queen of England and Hungary, Queen of England by marriage to Henry the Young King and queen of Hungary and Croatia by marriage to Béla III of Hungary (d. 1197)
 Tomoe Gozen, female Samurai warrior and military leader (d. 1247)

Deaths 
 January 24 or January 25 – Agnes of Babenberg, Politically active High Duchess consort of Poland (b. 1111)
 May 8 – Ahmed Sanjar, Great Seljuk Sultan (b. 1084 or 1086)
 May 15 – Yury Dolgoruky, Russian prince (b. c. 1099)
 August 21 – King Alfonso VII of Castile (b. 1105)
 October 23 – King Sweyn III of Denmark (b.c. 1125) (in battle)
 date unknown – King Eystein II of Norway (b.c. 1125)

References